The 9 September massacres were two series of massacres of prisoners at Versailles on 9 September 1792 during the French Revolution. They occurred in the context of the September Massacres. Claude Fournier was accused of complicity in them. Those killed included Charles d'Abancourt, Claude Antoine de Valdec de Lessart and Louis Hercule Timoléon de Cossé-Brissac.

Context

The prisoners of Orléans

The prisoners of Versailles

The following evening, the assassins returned to the écuries de la Reine, now known as the prison of Versailles, to carry out a second massacre of 30 inmates.

External links
 Diagnopsy : Les massacres de septembre
 Quid : see the chapter Constitution du 3-9-1791. Haute Cour nationale

1792 events of the French Revolution

fr:Massacres du 9 septembre 1792 à Versailles